{{Infobox military conflict
| conflict = Battle of the Little Bighorn
| partof = the Great Sioux War of 1876
| image = 
| caption = The Battle of Little Bighorn by Charles Marion Russell
| date = June 25–26, 1876
| place = Near Little Bighorn River, Crow Indian Reservation, Big Horn County, Montana, U.S.
| coordinates = 
| map_type = Montana
| map_relief = 
| map_size = 
| map_marksize = 
| map_caption = Location within Montana
| map_label = Little Big Horn Battlefield
| territory = 
| result = Lakota, Northern Cheyenne, and Arapaho victory
| combatants_header = Belligerents
| combatant1 = 
| combatant2 = 
| commander1 = 
| commander2 = 
| units1 = Nations of the plains
| units2 = 7th Cavalry Regiment
| strength1 = 1,100–2,500 warriors
| strength2 = c. 700 cavalrymen and scouts
| casualties1 = 
| casualties2 = 
| campaignbox = 
}}

The Battle of the Little Bighorn, known to the Lakota and other Plains Indians as the Battle of the Greasy Grass, and also commonly referred to as Custer's Last Stand, was an armed engagement between combined forces of the Lakota Sioux, Northern Cheyenne, and Arapaho tribes and the 7th Cavalry Regiment of the United States Army. The battle, which resulted in the defeat of U.S. forces, was the most significant action of the Great Sioux War of 1876. It took place on June 25–26, 1876, along the Little Bighorn River in the Crow Indian Reservation in southeastern Montana Territory.

Most battles in the Great Sioux War, including the Battle of the Little Bighorn (14 on the map to the right), "were on lands those Indians had taken from other tribes since 1851".Stands In Timber, John and Margot Liberty (1972): Cheyenne Memories. Lincoln and London. p. 170, note 13.White, Richard: "The Winning of the West: The Expansion of the Western Sioux in the Eighteenth and Nineteenth Centuries", The Journal of American History, Vo. 65, No. 2 (Sep. 1987), pp. 319–343 [342]. The Lakotas were there without consent from the local Crow tribe, which had treaty on the area. Already in 1873, Crow chief Blackfoot had called for U.S. military actions against the Indian intruders.Annual Report of the Commissioner of Indian Affairs, 1873. Washington 1874, p. 124. The steady Lakota invasion (a reaction to encroachment in the Black Hills) into treaty areas belonging to the smaller tribes ensured the United States a firm Indian alliance with the Arikaras and the Crows during the Lakota Wars.Dunlay, Thomas W. (1982). Wolves for the Blue Soldiers. Indian Scouts and Auxiliaries with the United States Army, 1860–90. Lincoln and London. pp. 112–114.

The fight was an overwhelming victory for the Lakota, Northern Cheyenne, and Arapaho, who were led by several major war leaders, including Crazy Horse and Chief Gall, and had been inspired by the visions of Sitting Bull (Tȟatȟáŋka Íyotake). The U.S. 7th Cavalry, a force of 700 men, suffered a major defeat while commanded by Lieutenant Colonel George Armstrong Custer (formerly a brevetted major general during the American Civil War). Five of the 7th Cavalry's twelve companies were wiped out and Custer was killed, as were two of his brothers, a nephew, and a brother-in-law. The total U.S. casualty count included 268 dead and 55 severely wounded (six died later from their wounds), including four Crow Indian scouts and at least two Arikara Indian scouts.

Public response to the Great Sioux War varied in the immediate aftermath of the battle. Libbie Custer, Custer's widow, soon worked to burnish her husband's memory, and during the following decades Custer and his troops came to be considered heroic figures in American history. The battle, and Custer's actions in particular, have been studied extensively by historians. Little Bighorn Battlefield National Monument honors those who fought on both sides.

 Background 
 Battlefield and surrounding areas 
In 1805, fur trader François Antoine Larocque reported joining a Crow camp in the Yellowstone area. On the way he noted that the Crow hunted buffalo on the "Small Horn River". St. Louis-based fur trader Manuel Lisa built Fort Raymond in 1807 for trade with the Crow. The area is first noted in the 1851 Treaty of Fort Laramie.

In the latter half of the 19th century, tensions increased between the Native inhabitants of the Great Plains of the US and encroaching settlers. This resulted in a series of conflicts known as the Sioux Wars, which took place from 1854 to 1890. While some of the indigenous people eventually agreed to relocate to ever-shrinking reservations, a number of them resisted, sometimes fiercely.

On May 7, 1868, the valley of the Little Bighorn became a tract in the eastern part of the new Crow Indian Reservation in the center of the old Crow country. There were numerous skirmishes between the Sioux and Crow tribes, so when the Sioux were in the valley in 1876 without the consent of the Crow tribe, the Crow supported the US Army to expel the Sioux (e.g., Crows enlisted as Army scouts and Crow warriors would fight in the nearby Battle of the Rosebud).

The geography of the battlefield is very complex, consisting of dissected uplands, rugged bluffs, the Little Bighorn River, and adjacent plains, all areas close to one another. Vegetation varies widely from one area to the next.

The battlefield is known as "Greasy Grass" to the Lakota Sioux, Dakota Sioux, Cheyenne, and most other Plains Indians; however, in contemporary accounts by participants, it was referred to as the "Valley of Chieftains".

 1876 Sun Dance ceremony 
Among the Plains Tribes, the long-standing ceremonial tradition known as the Sun Dance was the most important religious event of the year. It is a time for prayer and personal sacrifice for the community, as well as for making personal vows and resolutions. Towards the end of spring in 1876, the Lakota and the Cheyenne held a Sun Dance that was also attended by some "agency Indians" who had slipped away from their reservations. During a Sun Dance around June 5, 1876, on Rosebud Creek in Montana, Sitting Bull, the spiritual leader of the Hunkpapa Lakota, reportedly had a vision of "soldiers falling into his camp like grasshoppers from the sky." At the same time US military officials were conducting a summer campaign to force the Lakota and the Cheyenne back to their reservations, using infantry and cavalry in a so-called "three-pronged approach".

 1876 U.S. military campaign 

Col. John Gibbon's column of six companies (A, B, E, H, I, and K) of the 7th Infantry and four companies (F, G, H, and L) of the 2nd Cavalry marched east from Fort Ellis in western Montana on March 30 to patrol the Yellowstone River. Brig. Gen. George Crook's column of ten companies (A, B, C, D, E, F, G, I, L, and M) of the 3rd Cavalry, five companies (A, B, D, E, and I) of the 2nd Cavalry, two companies (D and F) of the 4th Infantry, and three companies (C, G, and H) of the 9th Infantry moved north from Fort Fetterman in the Wyoming Territory on May 29, marching toward the Powder River area. Brig. Gen. Alfred Terry's column, including twelve companies (A, B, C, D, E, F, G, H, I, K, L, and M) of the 7th Cavalry under Lt. Col. George Armstrong Custer's immediate command, Companies C and G of the 17th Infantry, and the Gatling gun detachment of the 20th Infantry departed westward from Fort Abraham Lincoln in the Dakota Territory on May 17. They were accompanied by teamsters and packers with 150 wagons and a large contingent of pack mules that reinforced Custer. Companies C, D, and I of the 6th Infantry moved along the Yellowstone River from Fort Buford on the Missouri River to set up a supply depot and joined Terry on May 29 at the mouth of the Powder River. They were later joined there by the steamboat Far West, which was loaded with 200 tons of supplies from Fort Abraham Lincoln.

 7th Cavalry organization 
The 7th Cavalry had been created just after the American Civil War. Many men were veterans of the war, including most of the leading officers. A significant portion of the regiment had previously served 4½ years at Fort Riley, Kansas, during which time it fought one major engagement and numerous skirmishes, experiencing casualties of 36 killed and 27 wounded. Six other troopers had died of drowning and 51 in cholera epidemics. In November 1868, while stationed in Kansas, the 7th Cavalry under Custer had routed Black Kettle's Southern Cheyenne camp on the Washita River in the Battle of Washita River, an attack which was at the time labeled a "massacre of innocent Indians" by the Indian Bureau.

By the time of the Battle of the Little Bighorn, half of the 7th Cavalry's companies had just returned from 18 months of constabulary duty in the Deep South, having been recalled to Fort Abraham Lincoln, Dakota Territory to reassemble the regiment for the campaign. About 20% of the troopers had been enlisted in the prior seven months (139 of an enlisted roll of 718), were only marginally trained and had no combat or frontier experience. About 60% of these recruits were American, the rest were European immigrants (Most were Irish and German)—just as many of the veteran troopers had been before their enlistments. Archaeological evidence suggests that many of these troopers were malnourished and in poor physical condition, despite being the best-equipped and supplied regiment in the Army.Barnard, pp. 121–36.

Of the 45 officers and 718 troopers then assigned to the 7th Cavalry (including a second lieutenant detached from the 20th Infantry and serving in Company L), 14 officers (including the regimental commander) and 152 troopers did not accompany the 7th during the campaign. The regimental commander, Colonel Samuel D. Sturgis, was on detached duty as the Superintendent of Mounted Recruiting Service and commander of the Cavalry Depot in St. Louis, Missouri, which left Lieutenant Colonel Custer in command of the regiment. The ratio of troops detached for other duty (approximately 22%) was not unusual for an expedition of this size, and part of the officer shortage was chronic, due to the Army's rigid seniority system: three of the regiment's 12 captains were permanently detached, and two had never served a day with the 7th since their appointment in July 1866. Three second lieutenant vacancies (in E, H, and L Companies) were also unfilled.

 Battle of the Rosebud 
The Army's coordination and planning began to go awry on June 17, 1876, when Crook's column retreated after the Battle of the Rosebud, just  to the southeast of the eventual Little Bighorn battlefield. Surprised and according to some accounts astonished by the unusually large numbers of Native Americans, Crook held the field at the end of the battle but felt compelled by his losses to pull back, regroup, and wait for reinforcements. Unaware of Crook's battle, Gibbon and Terry proceeded, joining forces in early June near the mouth of Rosebud Creek. They reviewed Terry's plan calling for Custer's regiment to proceed south along the Rosebud while Terry and Gibbon's united forces would move in a westerly direction toward the Bighorn and Little Bighorn rivers. As this was the likely location of Native encampments, all army elements had been instructed to converge there around June 26 or 27 in an attempt to engulf the Native Americans. On June 22, Terry ordered the 7th Cavalry, composed of 31 officers and 566 enlisted men under Custer, to begin a reconnaissance in force and pursuit along the Rosebud, with the prerogative to "depart" from orders if Custer saw "sufficient reason". Custer had been offered the use of Gatling guns but declined, believing they would slow his rate of march.

 Little Bighorn 

After a night's march, the tired officer who was sent with the scouts could see neither, and when Custer joined them, he was also unable to make the sighting.

Custer contemplated a surprise attack against the encampment the following morning of June 26, but he then received a report informing him several hostiles had discovered the trail left by his troops. Assuming his presence had been exposed, Custer decided to attack the village without further delay. On the morning of June 25, Custer divided his 12 companies into three battalions in anticipation of the forthcoming engagement. Three companies were placed under the command of Major Marcus Reno (A, G, and M) and three were placed under the command of Captain Frederick Benteen (H, D, and K). Five companies (C, E, F, I, and L) remained under Custer's immediate command. The 12th, Company B under Captain Thomas McDougall, had been assigned to escort the slower pack train carrying provisions and additional ammunition.

Unknown to Custer, the group of Native Americans seen on his trail was actually leaving the encampment and did not alert the rest of the village. Custer's scouts warned him about the size of the village, with Mitch Bouyer reportedly saying, "General, I have been with these Indians for 30 years, and this is the largest village I have ever heard of." Custer's overriding concern was that the Native American group would break up and scatter. The command began its approach to the village at noon and prepared to attack in full daylight.

With an impending sense of doom, the Crow scout Half Yellow Face prophetically warned Custer (speaking through the interpreter Mitch Bouyer), "You and I are going home today by a road we do not know."

 Prelude 
 Military assumptions prior to the battle 

 Number of Indian warriors 

As the Army moved into the field on its expedition, it was operating with incorrect assumptions as to the number of Indians it would encounter. These assumptions were based on inaccurate information provided by the Indian Agents that no more than 800 "hostiles" were in the area. The Indian Agents based this estimate on the number of Lakota that Sitting Bull and other leaders had reportedly led off the reservation in protest of U.S. government policies. It was in fact a correct estimate until several weeks before the battle when the "reservation Indians" joined Sitting Bull's ranks for the summer buffalo hunt. The agents did not consider the many thousands of these "reservation Indians" who had unofficially left the reservation to join their "unco-operative non-reservation cousins led by Sitting Bull". Thus, Custer unknowingly faced thousands of Indians, including the 800 non-reservation "hostiles". All Army plans were based on the incorrect numbers. Although Custer was criticized after the battle for not having accepted reinforcements and for dividing his forces, it appears that he had accepted the same official government estimates of hostiles in the area which Terry and Gibbon had also accepted. Historian James Donovan notes, however, that when Custer later asked interpreter Fred Gerard for his opinion on the size of the opposition, he estimated the force at 1,100 warriors.

Additionally, Custer was more concerned with preventing the escape of the Lakota and Cheyenne than with fighting them. From his observation, as reported by John Martin (Giovanni Martino), Custer assumed the warriors had been sleeping in on the morning of the battle, to which virtually every native account attested later, giving Custer a false estimate of what he was up against. When he and his scouts first looked down on the village from the Crow's Nest across the Little Bighorn River, they could see only the herd of ponies. Custer's Crow scouts told him it was the largest native village they had ever seen. When the scouts began changing back into their native dress right before the battle, Custer released them from his command. While the village was enormous, Custer still thought there were far fewer warriors to defend the village.

Finally, Custer may have assumed when he encountered the Native Americans that his subordinate Benteen, who was with the pack train, would provide support. Rifle volleys were a standard way of telling supporting units to come to another unit's aid. In a subsequent official 1879 Army investigation requested by Major Reno, the Reno Board of Inquiry (RCOI), Benteen and Reno's men testified that they heard distinct rifle volleys as late as 4:30 pm during the battle.

Custer had initially wanted to take a day to scout the village before attacking; however, when men who went back looking for supplies accidentally dropped by the pack train, they discovered that their track had already been discovered by Indians. Reports from his scouts also revealed fresh pony tracks from ridges overlooking his formation. It became apparent that the warriors in the village were either aware or would soon be aware of his approach. Fearing that the village would break up into small bands that he would have to chase, Custer began to prepare for an immediate attack.

 Role of Indian noncombatants in Custer's strategy 
Custer's field strategy was designed to engage non-combatants at the encampments on the Little Bighorn to capture women, children, and the elderly or disabled to serve as hostages to convince the warriors to surrender and comply with federal orders to relocate. Custer's battalions were poised to "ride into the camp and secure non-combatant hostages", and "forc[e] the warriors to surrender". Author Evan S. Connell observed that if Custer could occupy the village before widespread resistance developed, the Sioux and Cheyenne warriors "would be obliged to surrender, because if they started to fight, they would be endangering their families."

In Custer's book My Life on the Plains, published two years before the Battle of the Little Bighorn, he asserted:

On Custer's decision to advance up the bluffs and descend on the village from the east, Lt. Edward Godfrey of Company K surmised:

The Sioux and Cheyenne fighters were acutely aware of the danger posed by the military engagement of non-combatants and that "even a semblance of an attack on the women and children" would draw the warriors back to the village, according to historian John S. Gray. Such was their concern that an apparent reconnaissance by Capt. Yates' E and F Companies at the mouth of Medicine Tail Coulee (Minneconjou Ford) caused hundreds of warriors to disengage from the Reno valley fight and return to deal with the threat to the village.

Some authors and historians, based on archaeological evidence and reviews of native testimony, speculate that Custer attempted to cross the river at a point further north they refer to as Ford D. According to Richard A. Fox, James Donovan, and others, Custer proceeded with a wing of his battalion (Yates' E and F companies) north and opposite the Cheyenne circle at that crossing, which provided "access to the [women and children] fugitives." Yates's force "posed an immediate threat to fugitive Indian families..." gathering at the north end of the huge encampment; he then persisted in his efforts to "seize women and children" even as hundreds of warriors were massing around Keogh's wing on the bluffs. Yates' wing, descending to the Little Bighorn River at Ford D, encountered "light resistance", undetected by the Indian forces ascending the bluffs east of the village. Custer was almost within "striking distance of the refugees" before abandoning the ford and returning to Custer Ridge.

 Lone Teepee 
The Lone Teepee (or Tipi) was a landmark along the 7th Cavalry's march. It was where the Indian encampment had been a week earlier, during the Battle of the Rosebud on June 17, 1876. The Indians had left a single teepee standing (some reports mention a second that had been partially dismantled), and in it was the body of a Sans Arc warrior, Old She-Bear, who had been wounded in the battle. He had died a couple of days after the Rosebud battle, and it was the custom of the Indians to move camp when a warrior died and leave the body with its possessions. The Lone Teepee was an important location during the Battle of the Little Bighorn for several reasons, including:
 It is where Custer gave Reno his final orders to attack the village ahead. It is also where some Indians who had been following the command were seen and Custer assumed he had been discovered.
 Many of the survivors' accounts use the Lone Teepee as a point of reference for event times or distances.
 Knowing this location helps establish the pattern of the Indians' movements to the encampment on the river where the soldiers found them.

 Battle 

 Reno's attack 

The first group to attack was Major Reno's second detachment (Companies A, G and M) after receiving orders from Custer written out by Lt. William W. Cooke, as Custer's Crow scouts reported Sioux tribe members were alerting the village. Ordered to charge, Reno began that phase of the battle. The orders, made without accurate knowledge of the village's size, location, or the warriors' propensity to stand and fight, had been to pursue the Native Americans and "bring them to battle." Reno's force crossed the Little Bighorn at the mouth of what is today Reno Creek around 3:00 pm on June 25. They immediately realized that the Lakota and Northern Cheyenne were present "in force and not running away."
 
Reno advanced rapidly across the open field towards the northwest, his movements masked by the thick belt of trees that ran along the southern banks of the Little Bighorn River. The same trees on his front right shielded his movements across the wide field over which his men rapidly rode, first with two approximately forty-man companies abreast and eventually with all three charging abreast. The trees also obscured Reno's view of the Native American village until his force had passed that bend on his right front and was suddenly within arrow-shot of the village. The tepees in that area were occupied by the Hunkpapa Sioux. Neither Custer nor Reno had much idea of the length, depth and size of the encampment they were attacking, as the village was hidden by the trees. When Reno came into the open in front of the south end of the village, he sent his Arikara/Ree and Crow Indian scouts forward on his exposed left flank. Realizing the full extent of the village's width, Reno quickly suspected what he would later call "a trap" and stopped a few hundred yards short of the encampment.

He ordered his troopers to dismount and deploy in a skirmish line, according to standard army doctrine. In this formation, every fourth trooper held the horses for the troopers in firing position, with  separating each trooper, officers to their rear and troopers with horses behind the officers. This formation reduced Reno's firepower by 25 percent. As Reno's men fired into the village and killed, by some accounts, several wives and children of the Sioux leader, Chief Gall (in Lakota, Phizí), the mounted warriors began streaming out to meet the attack. With Reno's men anchored on their right by the protection of the tree line and bend in the river, the Indians rode against the center and exposed left end of Reno's line. After about 20 minutes of long-distance firing, Reno had taken only one casualty, but the odds against him had risen (Reno estimated five to one), and Custer had not reinforced him. Trooper Billy Jackson reported that by then, the Indians had begun massing in the open area shielded by a small hill to the left of Reno's line and to the right of the Indian village. From this position the Indians mounted an attack of more than 500 warriors against the left and rear of Reno's line, turning Reno's exposed left flank. This forced a hasty withdrawal into the timber along the bend in the river. Here the Native Americans pinned Reno and his men down and tried to set fire to the brush to try to drive the soldiers out of their position.

Reno's Arikara scout, Bloody Knife, was shot in the head, splattering brains and blood onto Reno's face. The shaken Reno ordered his men to dismount and mount again. He then said, "All those who wish to make their escape follow me." Abandoning the wounded (dooming them to their deaths), he led a disorderly rout for a mile next to the river. He made no attempt to engage the Indians to prevent them from picking off men in the rear. The retreat was immediately disrupted by Cheyenne attacks at close quarters. Indians both fired on the soldiers from a distance, and within close quarters, pulled them off their horses and clubbed their heads. Later, Reno reported that three officers and 29 troopers had been killed during the retreat and subsequent fording of the river. Another officer and 13–18 men were missing. Most of these missing men were left behind in the timber, although many eventually rejoined the detachment.

 Reno and Benteen on Reno Hill 

Atop the bluffs, known today as Reno Hill, Reno's depleted and shaken troops were joined about a half-hour later by Captain Benteen's column (Companies D, H and K), arriving from the south. This force had been returning from a lateral scouting mission when it had been summoned by Custer's messenger, Italian bugler John Martin (Giovanni Martino) with the handwritten message "Benteen. Come on, Big Village, Be quick, Bring packs. P.S. Bring Packs." This message made no sense to Benteen, as his men would be needed more in a fight than the packs carried by herd animals. Though both men inferred that Custer was engaged in battle, Reno refused to move until the packs arrived so his men could resupply. The detachments were later reinforced by McDougall's Company B and the pack train. The 14 officers and 340 troopers on the bluffs organized an all-around defense and dug rifle pits using whatever implements they had among them, including knives. This practice had become standard during the last year of the American Civil War, with both Union and Confederate troops utilizing knives, eating utensils, mess plates and pans to dig effective battlefield fortifications.

Despite hearing heavy gunfire from the north, including distinct volleys at 4:20 pm, Benteen concentrated on reinforcing Reno's badly wounded and hard-pressed detachment rather than continuing on toward Custer's position. Benteen's apparent reluctance to reach Custer prompted later criticism that he had failed to follow orders. Around 5:00 pm, Capt. Thomas Weir and Company D moved out to contact Custer. They advanced a mile, to what is today Weir Ridge or Weir Point. Weir could see that the Indian camps comprised some 1,800 lodges. Behind them he saw through the dust and smoke hills that were oddly red in color; he later learned that this was a massive assemblage of Indian ponies. By this time, roughly 5:25 pm, Custer's battle may have concluded. From a distance, Weir witnessed many Indians on horseback and on foot shooting at items on the ground-perhaps killing wounded soldiers and firing at dead bodies on the "Last Stand Hill" at the northern end of the Custer battlefield. Some historians have suggested that what Weir witnessed was a fight on what is now called Calhoun Hill, some minutes earlier. The destruction of Keogh's battalion may have begun with the collapse of L, I and C Company (half of it) following the combined assaults led by Crazy Horse, White Bull, Hump, Chief Gall and others. Other native accounts contradict this understanding, however, and the time element remains a subject of debate. The other entrenched companies eventually left Reno Hill and followed Weir by assigned battalions—first Benteen, then Reno, and finally the pack train. The men on Weir Ridge were attacked by natives, increasingly coming from the apparently concluded Custer engagement, forcing all seven companies to return to the bluff before the pack train had moved even a quarter mile. The companies remained pinned down on the bluff, fending off the Indians for three hours until night fell. The soldiers dug crude trenches as the Indians performed their war dance.

Benteen was hit in the heel of his boot by an Indian bullet. At one point, he led a counterattack to push back Indians who had continued to crawl through the grass closer to the soldier's positions.

 Custer's fight 

The precise details of Custer's fight and his movements before and during the battle are largely conjectural since none of the men who went forward with Custer's battalion (the five companies under his immediate command) survived the battle. Later accounts from surviving Indians are useful but are sometimes conflicting and unclear.

While the gunfire heard on the bluffs by Reno and Benteen's men during the afternoon of June 25 was probably from Custer's fight, the soldiers on Reno Hill were unaware of what had happened to Custer until General Terry's arrival two days later on June 27. They were reportedly stunned by the news. When the army examined the Custer battle site, soldiers could not determine fully what had transpired. Evidence of organized resistance included an apparent skirmish line on Calhoun Hill and apparent breastworks made of dead horses on Custer Hill. By the time troops came to recover the bodies, the Lakota and Cheyenne had already removed most of their own dead from the field. The troops found most of Custer's dead men stripped of their clothing, ritually mutilated, and in a state of decomposition, making identification of many impossible. The soldiers identified the 7th Cavalry's dead as well as they could and hastily buried them where they fell.

Custer's body was found with two gunshot wounds, one to his left chest and the other to his left temple. Either wound would have been fatal, though he appeared to have bled from only the chest wound; some scholars believe his head wound may have been delivered postmortem. Some Lakota oral histories assert that Custer, having sustained a wound, committed suicide to avoid capture and subsequent torture. This would be inconsistent with his known right-handedness, but that does not rule out assisted suicide (other native accounts note several soldiers committing suicide near the end of the battle). Custer's body was found near the top of Custer Hill, which also came to be known as "Last Stand Hill". There the United States erected a tall memorial obelisk inscribed with the names of the 7th Cavalry's casualties.

Several days after the battle, Curley, Custer's Crow scout who had left Custer near Medicine Tail Coulee (a drainage which led to the river), recounted the battle, reporting that Custer had attacked the village after attempting to cross the river. He was driven back, retreating toward the hill where his body was found. As the scenario seemed compatible with Custer's aggressive style of warfare and with evidence found on the ground, it became the basis of many popular accounts of the battle.

According to Pretty Shield, the wife of Goes-Ahead (another Crow scout for the 7th Cavalry), Custer was killed while crossing the river: "...and he died there, died in the water of the Little Bighorn, with Two-bodies, and the blue soldier carrying his flag". In this account, Custer was allegedly killed by a Lakota called Big-nose. However, in Chief Gall's version of events, as recounted to Lt. Edward Settle Godfrey, Custer did not attempt to ford the river and the nearest that he came to the river or village was his final position on the ridge. Chief Gall's statements were corroborated by other Indians, notably the wife of Spotted Horn Bull. Given that no bodies of men or horses were found anywhere near the ford, Godfrey himself concluded "that Custer did not go to the ford with any body of men".

Cheyenne oral tradition credits Buffalo Calf Road Woman with striking the blow that knocked Custer off his horse before he died.

 Custer at Minneconjou Ford 

Having isolated Reno's force and driven them away from their encampment, the bulk of the native warriors were free to pursue Custer. The route taken by Custer to his "Last Stand" remains a subject of debate. One possibility is that after ordering Reno to charge, Custer continued down Reno Creek to within about a half-mile (800 m) of the Little Bighorn, but then turned north and climbed up the bluffs, reaching the same spot to which Reno would soon retreat. From this point on the other side of the river, he could see Reno charging the village. Riding north along the bluffs, Custer could have descended into Medicine Tail Coulee. Some historians believe that part of Custer's force descended the coulee, going west to the river and attempting unsuccessfully to cross into the village. According to some accounts, a small contingent of Indian sharpshooters effectively opposed this crossing.

White Cow Bull claimed to have shot a leader wearing a buckskin jacket off his horse in the river. While no other Indian account supports this claim, if White Bull did shoot a buckskin-clad leader off his horse, some historians have argued that Custer may have been seriously wounded by him. Some Indian accounts claim that besides wounding one of the leaders of this advance, a soldier carrying a company guidon was also hit. Troopers had to dismount to help the wounded men back onto their horses. The fact that either of the non-mutilation wounds to Custer's body (a bullet wound below the heart and a shot to the left temple) would have been instantly fatal casts doubt on his being wounded and remounted.

Reports of an attempted fording of the river at Medicine Tail Coulee might explain Custer's purpose for Reno's attack, that is, a coordinated "hammer-and-anvil" maneuver, with Reno's holding the Indians at bay at the southern end of the camp, while Custer drove them against Reno's line from the north. Other historians have noted that if Custer did attempt to cross the river near Medicine Tail Coulee, he may have believed it was the north end of the Indian camp, only to discover that it was the middle. Some Indian accounts, however, place the Northern Cheyenne encampment and the north end of the overall village to the left (and south) of the opposite side of the crossing. The precise location of the north end of the village remains in dispute, however.

In 1908, Edward Curtis, the famed ethnologist and photographer of the Native American Indians, made a detailed personal study of the battle, interviewing many of those who had fought or taken part in it. First, he went over the ground covered by the troops with the three Crow scouts White Man Runs Him, Goes Ahead, and Hairy Moccasin, and then again with Two Moons and a party of Cheyenne warriors. He also visited the Lakota country and interviewed Red Hawk, "whose recollection of the fight seemed to be particularly clear". Then, he went over the battlefield once more with the three Crow scouts, but also accompanied by General Charles Woodruff "as I particularly desired that the testimony of these men might be considered by an experienced army officer". Finally, Curtis visited the country of the Arikara and interviewed the scouts of that tribe who had been with Custer's command. Based on all the information he gathered, Curtis concluded that Custer had indeed ridden down the Medicine Tail Coulee and then towards the river where he probably planned to ford it. However, "the Indians had now discovered him and were gathered closely on the opposite side". They were soon joined by a large force of Sioux who (no longer engaging Reno) rushed down the valley. This was the beginning of their attack on Custer who was forced to turn and head for the hill where he would make his famous "last stand". Thus, wrote Curtis, "Custer made no attack, the whole movement being a retreat".

 Other views of Custer's actions at Minneconjou Ford 

Other historians claim that Custer never approached the river, but rather continued north across the coulee and up the other side, where he gradually came under attack. According to this theory, by the time Custer realized he was badly outnumbered, it was too late to retreat to the south where Reno and Benteen could have provided assistance. Two men from the 7th Cavalry, the young Crow scout Ashishishe (known in English as Curley) and the trooper Peter Thompson, claimed to have seen Custer engage the Indians. The accuracy of their recollections remains controversial; accounts by battle participants and assessments by historians almost universally discredit Thompson's claim.

Archaeological evidence and reassessment of Indian testimony have led to a new interpretation of the battle. In the 1920s, battlefield investigators discovered hundreds of .45-70 shell cases along the ridge line known today as Nye-Cartwright Ridge, between South Medicine Tail Coulee and the next drainage at North Medicine Tail (also known as Deep Coulee). Some historians believe Custer divided his detachment into two (and possibly three) battalions, retaining personal command of one while presumably delegating Captain George W. Yates to command the second.

Evidence from the 1920s supports the theory that at least one of the companies made a feint attack southwest from Nye-Cartwright Ridge straight down the center of the "V" formed by the intersection at the crossing of Medicine Tail Coulee on the right and Calhoun Coulee on the left. The intent may have been to relieve pressure on Reno's detachment (according to the Crow scout Curley, possibly viewed by both Mitch Bouyer and Custer) by withdrawing the skirmish line into the timber near the Little Bighorn River. Had the U.S. troops come straight down Medicine Tail Coulee, their approach to the Minneconjou Crossing and the northern area of the village would have been masked by the high ridges running on the northwest side of the Little Bighorn River.

That they might have come southwest, from the center of Nye-Cartwright Ridge, seems to be supported by Northern Cheyenne accounts of seeing the approach of the distinctly white-colored horses of Company E, known as the Grey Horse Company. Its approach was seen by Indians at that end of the village. Behind them, a second company, further up on the heights, would have provided long-range cover fire. Warriors could have been drawn to the feint attack, forcing the battalion back towards the heights, up the north fork drainage, away from the troops providing cover fire above. The covering company would have moved towards a reunion, delivering heavy volley fire and leaving the trail of expended cartridges discovered 50 years later.

 Last stand 
In the end, the hilltop to which Custer had moved was probably too small to accommodate all of the survivors and wounded. Fire from the southeast made it impossible for Custer's men to secure a defensive position all around Last Stand Hill where the soldiers put up their most dogged defense. According to Lakota accounts, far more of their casualties occurred in the attack on Last Stand Hill than anywhere else. The extent of the soldiers' resistance indicated they had few doubts about their prospects for survival. According to Cheyenne and Sioux testimony, the command structure rapidly broke down, although smaller "last stands" were apparently made by several groups. Custer's remaining companies (E, F, and half of C) were soon killed.

By almost all accounts, the Lakota annihilated Custer's force within an hour of engagement.Graham, Benteen letter to Capt. R.E. Thompson, p. 211. David Humphreys Miller, who between 1935 and 1955 interviewed the last Lakota survivors of the battle, wrote that the Custer fight lasted less than one-half hour. Other native accounts said the fighting lasted only "as long as it takes a hungry man to eat a meal." The Lakota asserted that Crazy Horse personally led one of the large groups of warriors who overwhelmed the cavalrymen in a surprise charge from the northeast, causing a breakdown in the command structure and panic among the troops. Many of these men threw down their weapons while Cheyenne and Sioux warriors rode them down, "counting coup" with lances, coup sticks, and quirts. Some Native accounts recalled this segment of the fight as a "buffalo run."

Captain Frederick Benteen, battalion leader of Companies D, H and K, on the 18th day of the Reno Court of Inquiry gave his observations on the Custer battlefield on June 27, 1876:

A Brulé Sioux warrior stated: "In fact, Hollow Horn Bear believed that the troops were in good order at the start of the fight, and kept their organization even while moving from point to point." Red Horse, an Oglala Sioux warrior, commented: "Here [Last Stand Hill] the soldiers made a desperate fight." One Hunkpapa Sioux warrior, Moving Robe, noted that "It was a hotly contested battle", while another, Iron Hawk, stated: "The Indians pressed and crowded right in around Custer Hill. But the soldiers weren't ready to die. We stood there a long time." In a letter from February 21, 1910, Private William Taylor, Company M, 7th Cavalry, wrote: "Reno proved incompetent and Benteen showed his indifference—I will not use the uglier words that have often been in my mind. Both failed Custer and he had to fight it out alone."

 Custer's final resistance 

Recent archaeological work at the battlefield indicates that officers on Custer Hill restored some tactical control. E Company rushed off Custer Hill toward the Little Bighorn River but failed to reach it, which resulted in the destruction of that company. This left about 50-60 men, mostly from F Company and the staff, on Last Stand Hill. The remainder of the battle took on the nature of a running fight. Modern archaeology and historical Indian accounts indicate that Custer's force may have been divided into three groups, with the Indians attempting to prevent them from effectively reuniting. Indian accounts describe warriors (including women) running up from the village to wave blankets in order to scare off the soldiers' horses. One 7th Cavalry trooper claimed to have found several stone mallets consisting of a round cobble weighing 8–10 pounds (about 4 kg) with a rawhide handle, which he believed had been used by the Indian women to finish off the wounded. Fighting dismounted, the soldiers' skirmish lines were overwhelmed. Army doctrine would have called for one man in four to be a horseholder behind the skirmish lines and, in extreme cases, one man in eight. Later, the troops would have bunched together in defensive positions and are alleged to have shot their remaining horses as cover. As individual troopers were wounded or killed, initial defensive positions would have been abandoned as untenable.

Under threat of attack, the first U.S. soldiers on the battlefield three days later hurriedly buried the troopers in shallow graves, more or less where they had fallen. A couple of years after the battle, markers were placed where men were believed to have fallen, so the placement of troops has been roughly construed. The troops evidently died in several groups, including on Custer Hill, around Captain Myles Keogh, and strung out towards the Little Bighorn River.

 Last break-out attempt 
According to Indian accounts, about forty men on Custer Hill made a desperate stand around Custer, delivering volley fire. The great majority of the Indian casualties were probably suffered during this closing segment of the battle, as the soldiers and Indians on Calhoun Ridge were more widely separated and traded fire at greater distances for most of their portion of the battle than did the soldiers and Indians on Custer Hill.

Modern documentaries suggest that there may not have been a "Last Stand", as traditionally portrayed in popular culture. Instead, archaeologists suggest that in the end, Custer's troops were not surrounded but rather overwhelmed by a single charge. This scenario corresponds to several Indian accounts stating Crazy Horse's charge swarmed the resistance, with the surviving soldiers fleeing in panic.Testimony of Yellow Nose. At least 28 bodies (the most common number associated with burial witness testimony), including that of scout Mitch Bouyer, were discovered in or near that gulch, their deaths possibly the battle's final actions.

Although the marker for Mitch Bouyer was found accurate through archaeological and forensic testing of remains, it is some 65 yards away from Deep Ravine. Historian Douglas Scott theorized that the "Deep Gulch" or "Deep Ravine" might have included not only the steep-sided portion of the coulee, but the entire drainage including its tributaries, in which case the bodies of Bouyer and others were found where eyewitnesses had said they were seen.

Other archaeological explorations done in Deep Ravine found no human remains associated with the battle. Over the years since the battle, skeletal remains that were reportedly recovered from the mouth of the Deep Ravine by various sources have been repatriated to the Little Big Horn National Monument. According to Scott, it is likely that in the 108 years between the battle and Scott's excavation efforts in the ravine, geological processes caused many of the remains to become unrecoverable. For example, near the town of Garryowen, portions of the skeleton of a trooper killed in the Reno Retreat were recovered from an eroding bank of the Little Big Horn, while the rest of the remains had apparently been washed away by the river.

 Aftermath 

After the Custer force was soundly defeated, the Lakota and Northern Cheyenne regrouped to attack Reno and Benteen. The fight continued until dark (approximately 9:00 pm) and for much of the next day, with the outcome in doubt. Reno credited Benteen's luck with repulsing a severe attack on the portion of the perimeter held by Companies H and M. On June 27, the column under General Terry approached from the north, and the natives drew off in the opposite direction. The Crow scout White Man Runs Him was the first to tell General Terry's officers that Custer's force had "been wiped out." Reno and Benteen's wounded troops were given what treatment was available at that time; five later died of their wounds. One of the regiment's three surgeons had been with Custer's column, while another, Dr. DeWolf, had been killed during Reno's retreat. The only remaining doctor was Assistant Surgeon Henry R. Porter.

The first to hear the news of the Custer defeat were those aboard the steamboat Far West, which had brought supplies for the expedition. Curley, one of Custer's scouts, rode up to the steamboat and tearfully conveyed the information to Grant Marsh, the boat's captain, and army officers. Marsh converted the Far West into a floating field hospital to carry the 52 wounded from the battle to Fort Lincoln. Traveling night and day, with a full head of steam, Marsh brought the steamer downriver to Bismarck, Dakota Territory, making the  run in the record time of 54 hours and bringing the first news of the military defeat which came to be popularly known as the "Custer Massacre". The editor of the Bismarck paper kept the telegraph operator busy for hours transmitting information to the New York Herald (for which he corresponded). News of the defeat arrived in the East as the U.S. was observing its centennial. The Army began to investigate, although its effectiveness was hampered by a concern for survivors, and the reputation of the officers. Custer's wife, Elizabeth Bacon Custer, in particular, guarded and promoted the ideal of him as the gallant hero, attacking any who cast an ill light on his reputation.

The Battle of the Little Bighorn had far-reaching consequences for the Natives. It was the beginning of the end of the "Indian Wars" and has even been referred to as "the Indians' last stand" in the area. Within 48 hours of the battle, the large encampment on the Little Bighorn broke up into smaller groups because there was not enough game and grass to sustain a large congregation of people and horses.

Oglala Sioux Black Elk recounted the exodus this way: "We fled all night, following the Greasy Grass. My two younger brothers and I rode in a pony-drag, and my mother put some young pups in with us. They were always trying to crawl out and I was always putting them back in, so I didn't sleep much."

The scattered Sioux and Cheyenne feasted and celebrated during July with no threat from soldiers. After their celebrations, many of the Natives returned to the reservation. Soon the number of warriors amounted to only about 600. Both Crook and Terry remained immobile for seven weeks after the battle, awaiting reinforcements and unwilling to venture out against the Sioux and Cheyenne until they had at least 2,000 men. Crook and Terry finally took the field against the Native forces in August. General Nelson A. Miles took command of the effort in October 1876. In May 1877, Sitting Bull escaped to Canada. Within days, Crazy Horse surrendered at Fort Robinson, Nebraska. The Great Sioux War ended on May 7 with Miles' defeat of a remaining band of Miniconjou Sioux.

Ownership of the Black Hills, which had been a focal point of the 1876 conflict, was determined by an ultimatum issued by the Manypenny Commission, according to which the Sioux were required to cede the land to the United States if they wanted the government to continue supplying rations to the reservations. Threatened with forced starvation, the Natives ceded Paha Sapa to the United States, but the Sioux never accepted the legitimacy of the transaction. They lobbied Congress to create a forum to decide their claim and subsequently litigated for 40 years; the United States Supreme Court in the 1980 decision United States v. Sioux Nation of Indians acknowledged that the United States had taken the Black Hills without just compensation. The Sioux refused the money subsequently offered and continue to insist on their right to occupy the land.

When the Crows got news from the battlefield, they went into grief. Crow woman Pretty Shield told how they were "crying ... for Son-of-the-morning-star [Custer] and his blue soldiers". With the defeat of Custer, it was still a real threat that the Lakotas would take over the eastern part of the Crow reservation and keep up the invasion. In the end, the army won the Sioux war. Crow chief Plenty Coups recalled with amazement how his tribe now finally could sleep without fear for Lakota attacks: "this was the first time I had ever known such a condition."

 Participants 
 7th Cavalry officers 
 Commanding Officer: Lt. Col. George Armstrong Custer (killed)
 Maj. Marcus Reno
 Adjutant: 1st Lt. William W. Cooke (killed)
 Assistant Surgeon George Edwin Lord (killed)
 Acting Assistant Surgeon James Madison DeWolf (killed)
 Acting Assistant Surgeon Henry Rinaldo Porter
 Chief of Scouts: 2nd Lt. Charles Varnum (detached from A Company, wounded)
 2nd in command of Scouts: 2nd Lt. Luther Hare (detached from K Company)
 Pack Train commander: 1st Lt. Edward Gustave Mathey (detached from M Company)
 A Company: Capt. Myles Moylan, 1st Lt. Charles DeRudio
 B Company: Capt. Thomas McDougall, 2nd Lt. Benjamin Hodgson (killed) as Adjutant to Major Reno
 C Company: Capt. Thomas Custer (killed), 2nd Lt. Henry Moore Harrington (killed)
 D Company: Capt. Thomas Weir, 2nd Lt. Winfield Edgerly
 E Company: 1st Lt. Algernon Smith (killed), 2nd Lt. James G. Sturgis (killed)
 F Company: Capt. George Yates (killed), 2nd Lt. William Reily (killed)
 G Company: 1st Lt. Donald McIntosh (killed), 2nd Lt. George D. Wallace
 H Company: Capt. Frederick Benteen, 1st Lt. Francis Gibson
 I Company: Capt. Myles Keogh (killed), 1st Lt. James Porter (killed)
 K Company: 1st Lt. Edward Settle Godfrey
 L Company: 1st Lt. James Calhoun (killed), 2nd Lt. John J. Crittenden (killed)
 M Company: Capt. Thomas French

 Native American leaders and warriors 

 The Lakota had formed a "Strongheart Society" of caretakers and providers for the camp, consisting of men who had demonstrated compassion, generosity and bravery. As the purpose of the tribes' gathering was to take counsel, they did not constitute an army or warrior class.
 Hunkpapa (Lakota): Sitting Bull, Four Horns, Crow King, Chief Gall, Black Moon, Rain-in-the-Face, Moving Robe Woman, Spotted Horn Bull, Iron Hawk, One Bull, Bull Head, Chasing Eagle, Little Big Man
 Sihasapa (Blackfoot Lakota): Crawler, Kill Eagle
 Minneconjou (Lakota): Chief Hump, Black Moon, Red Horse, Makes Room, Looks Up, Lame Deer, Dog-with-Horn, Dog Back Bone, White Bull, Feather Earring, Flying By
 Sans Arc (Lakota): Spotted Eagle, Red Bear, Long Road, Cloud Man
 Oglala (Lakota): Crazy Horse, He Dog, Kicking Bear, Flying Hawk, Chief Long Wolf, Black Elk, White Cow Bull, Running Eagle, Black Fox II
 Brule (Lakota): Two Eagles, Hollow Horn Bear, Brave Bird
 Two Kettles (Lakota): Runs-the-Enemy
 Lower Yanktonai (Dakota): Thunder Bear, Medicine Cloud, Iron Bear, Long Tree
 Wahpekute (Dakota): Inkpaduta, Sounds-the-Ground-as-He-Walks, White Eagle, White Tracking Earth
 Black Powder (Sioux Firearms trader): Black Powder, Johann Smidt
 Northern Cheyenne: Two Moons, Wooden Leg, Old Bear, Lame White Man, American Horse, Brave Wolf, Antelope Women, Thunder Bull Big Nose, Yellow Horse, Little Shield, Horse Road, Bob Tail Horse, Yellow Hair, Bear-Walks-on-a-Ridge, Black Hawk, Buffalo Calf Road Woman, Crooked Nose, Noisy Walking
 Arapahoes: Waterman, Sage, Left Hand, Yellow Eagle, Little Bird

 Arapaho participation 
Modern-day accounts include Arapaho warriors in the battle, but the five Arapaho men who were at the encampments were there only by accident. While on a hunting trip they came close to the village by the river and were captured and almost killed by the Lakota who believed the hunters were scouts for the U.S. Army. Two Moons, a Northern Cheyenne leader, interceded to save their lives.

 Notable scouts/interpreters 
The 7th Cavalry was accompanied by a number of scouts and interpreters:
 Bloody Knife: Arikara/Lakota scout (killed)
 Bob Tailed Bull: Arikara scout (killed)
 Boy Chief: Arikara scout
 Charley Reynolds: scout (killed)
 Curley: Crow scout
 Curling Head: Arikara scout
 Fred Gerard: interpreter
 Goes Ahead: Crow scout
 Goose: Arikara scout (wounded in the hand by a 7th Cavalry trooper)
 Hairy Moccasin: Crow scout
 Half Yellow Face, leader of Crow Scouts, also known as Paints Half His Face Yellow
 Isaiah Dorman: interpreter (killed)
 Little Brave: Arikara scout (killed)
 Little Sioux: Arikara scout
 Mitch Bouyer: scout/interpreter (killed)
 One Feather: Arikara scout
 Owl: Arikara scout
 Peter Jackson: half-Pikuni and half Blackfoot brother of William, scout
 Red Bear: Arikara scout
 Red Star: Arikara scout
 Running Wolf: Arikara scout
 Sitting Bear: Arikara scout
 Soldier: Arikara scout
 Strikes The Lodge: Arikara scout
 Strikes Two: Arikara scout
 Two Moons: Arikara/Cheyenne scout
 White Man Runs Him: Crow scout
 White Swan: Crow Scout (severely wounded)
 William Jackson: half-Pikuni and half Blackfoot scout
 Young Hawk: Arikara scout

 Order of battle 

 Casualties 
 Native American warriors 
Estimates of Native American casualties have differed widely, from as few as 36 dead (from Native American listings of the dead by name) to as many as 300. Lakota chief Red Horse told Col. W. H. Wood in 1877 that the Native Americans suffered 136 dead and 160 wounded during the battle. In 1881, Red Horse told Dr. C. E. McChesney the same numbers but in a series of drawings done by Red Horse to illustrate the battle, he drew only sixty figures representing Lakota and Cheyenne casualties. Of those sixty figures, only thirty-some are portrayed with a conventional Plains Indian method of indicating death. In the last 140 years, historians have been able to identify multiple Indian names pertaining to the same individual, which has greatly reduced previously inflated numbers. Today a list of positively known casualties exists that lists 99 names, attributed and consolidated to 31 identified warriors.

 Native American noncombatants 
Six unnamed Native American women and four unnamed children are known to have been killed at the beginning of the battle during Reno's charge. Among them were two wives and three children of the Hunkpapa Leader Pizi (Gall).

 7th Cavalry 
The 7th Cavalry suffered 52 percent casualties: 16 officers and 242 troopers killed or died of wounds, 1 officer and 51 troopers wounded. Every soldier of the five companies with Custer was killed (except for some Crow scouts and several troopers that had left that column before the battle or as the battle was starting). Among the dead were Custer's brothers Boston and Thomas, his brother-in-law James Calhoun, and his nephew Henry Reed.

In 1878, the army awarded 24 Medals of Honor to participants in the fight on the bluffs for bravery, most for risking their lives to carry water from the river up the hill to the wounded. Few on the non-Indian side questioned the conduct of the enlisted men, but many questioned the tactics, strategy and conduct of the officers. Indian accounts spoke of soldiers' panic-driven flight and suicide by those unwilling to fall captive to the Indians. While such stories were gathered by Thomas Bailey Marquis in a book in the 1930s, it was not published until 1976 because of the unpopularity of such assertions. Although soldiers may have believed captives would be tortured, Indians usually killed men outright and took as captive for adoption only young women and children. Indian accounts also noted the bravery of soldiers who fought to the death.

 Civilians killed (armed and embedded within the Army) 
 Boston Custer: brother of George and Thomas, forager for the 7th
 Mark Kellogg: reporter
 Henry Armstrong Reed: Custer's nephew, herder for the 7th

 Legacy 
 Reconstitution of the 7th Cavalry 

Beginning in July, the 7th Cavalry was assigned new officersMajor Elmer I. Otis of the 1st Cavalry was promoted to replace Custer effective June 25, 1876, but did not report until February 1877. Two 1876 West Point graduates designated for the 7th Cavalry were advanced to 1st lieutenant effective 10 days after their graduation. Four others appointed to other regiments, along with eight experienced 2nd lieutenants, were transferred and designated one to each company of the 7th. However, five declined the appointment, replaced by 2nd lieutenants of infantry and unappointed new officers in July and August 1876. Only three replacements were able to report while the 7th was still in the field. and recruiting efforts began to fill the depleted ranks. The regiment, reorganized into eight companies, remained in the field as part of the Terry Expedition, now based on the Yellowstone River at the mouth of the Bighorn and reinforced by Gibbon's column. On August 8, 1876, after Terry was further reinforced with the 5th Infantry, the expedition moved up Rosebud Creek in pursuit of the Lakota. It met with Crook's command, similarly reinforced, and the combined force, almost 4,000 strong, followed the Lakota trail northeast toward the Little Missouri River. Persistent rain and lack of supplies forced the column to dissolve and return to its varying starting points. The 7th Cavalry returned to Fort Abraham Lincoln to reconstitute. The regimental commander, Colonel Samuel D. Sturgis, returned from his detached duty in St. Louis, Missouri. Sturgis led the 7th Cavalry in the campaign against the Nez Perce in 1877.

 Expansion of the U.S. Army 
The U.S. Congress authorized appropriations to expand the Army by 2,500 men to meet the emergency after the defeat of the 7th Cavalry. For a session, the Democratic Party-controlled House of Representatives abandoned its campaign to reduce the size of the Army. Word of Custer's fate reached the 44th United States Congress as a conference committee was attempting to reconcile opposing appropriations bills approved by the House and the Republican Senate. They approved a measure to increase the size of cavalry companies to 100 enlisted men on July 24. The committee temporarily lifted the ceiling on the size of the Army by 2,500 on August 15.

 "Sell or Starve" 

As a result of the defeat in June 1876, Congress responded by attaching what the Sioux call the "sell or starve" rider to the Indian Appropriations Act of 1876 (enacted August 15, 1876), which cut off all rations for the Sioux until they terminated hostilities and ceded the Black Hills to the United States.United States v. Sioux Nation of Indians (Ct. Cl. 1979), 601 F.2d 1157, 1161 The Agreement of 1877 (enacted February 28, 1877) officially took away Sioux land and permanently established Indian reservations.

 Controversies 
 Reno's conduct 
The Battle of the Little Bighorn was the subject of an 1879 U.S. Army Court of Inquiry in Chicago, held at Reno's request, during which his conduct was scrutinized. Some testimony by non-Army officers suggested that he was drunk and a coward. The court found Reno's conduct to be without fault. After the battle, Thomas Rosser, James O'Kelly, and others continued to question the conduct of Reno due to his hastily ordered retreat. Defenders of Reno at the trial noted that, while the retreat was disorganized, Reno did not withdraw from his position until it became apparent that he was outnumbered and outflanked by the Native Americans. Contemporary accounts also point to the fact that Reno's scout, Bloody Knife, was shot in the head, spraying him with blood, possibly increasing his panic and distress.

 Custer's errors 
General Terry and others claimed that Custer made strategic errors from the start of the campaign. For instance, he refused to use a battery of Gatling guns and turned down General Terry's offer of an additional battalion of the 2nd Cavalry. Custer believed that the Gatling guns would impede his march up the Rosebud and hamper his mobility. His rapid march en route to the Little Bighorn averaged nearly  a day, so his assessment appears to have been accurate. Custer planned "to live and travel like Indians; in this manner the command will be able to go wherever the Indians can", he wrote in his Herald dispatch.

By contrast, each Gatling gun had to be hauled by four horses, and soldiers often had to drag the heavy guns by hand over obstacles. Each of the heavy, hand-cranked weapons could fire up to 350 rounds a minute, an impressive rate, but they were known to jam frequently. During the Black Hills Expedition two years earlier, a Gatling gun had turned over, rolled down a mountain, and shattered to pieces. Lieutenant William Low, commander of the artillery detachment, was said to have almost wept when he learned he had been excluded from the strike force.

Custer believed that the 7th Cavalry could handle any Indian force and that the addition of the four companies of the 2nd would not alter the outcome. When offered the 2nd Cavalry, he reportedly replied that the 7th "could handle anything." There is evidence that Custer suspected that he would be outnumbered by the Indians, although he did not know by how much. By dividing his forces, Custer could have caused the defeat of the entire column, had it not been for Benteen's and Reno's linking up to make a desperate yet successful stand on the bluff above the southern end of the camp.

The historian James Donovan believed that Custer's dividing his force into four smaller detachments (including the pack train) can be attributed to his inadequate reconnaissance; he also ignored the warnings of his Crow scouts and Charley Reynolds. By the time the battle began, Custer had already divided his forces into three battalions of differing sizes, of which he kept the largest. His men were widely scattered and unable to support each other.Wert, Jeffry D. (1964/1996) Custer: The Controversial Life of George Armstrong Custer. New York: Simon & Schuster, p. 327. Wanting to prevent any escape by the combined tribes to the south, where they could disperse into different groups, Custer believed that an immediate attack on the south end of the camp was the best course of action.

 Admiration for Custer 
Criticism of Custer was not universal. While investigating the battlefield, Lieutenant General Nelson A. Miles wrote in 1877, "The more I study the moves here [on the Little Big Horn], the more I have admiration for Custer." Facing major budget cutbacks, the U.S. Army wanted to avoid bad press and found ways to exculpate Custer. They blamed the defeat on the Indians' alleged possession of numerous repeating rifles and the overwhelming numerical superiority of the warriors.

The widowed Elizabeth Bacon Custer, who never remarried, wrote three popular books in which she fiercely protected her husband's reputation.Libbie Custer "spent almost sixty years commemorating her marriage—and her memories of it quite literally kept her alive....she was quintessentially the professional widow, forcing it to become a very touchy matter for any military writer or officer to criticize Custer for having insanely launched an attack without taking the most elementary precautions or making even an attempt at reconnaissance. To say or write such put one in the position of standing against bereaved Libbie". Smith, Gene (1993) op cit. She lived until 1933, hindering much serious research until most of the evidence was long gone. In addition, Captain Frederick Whittaker's 1876 book idealizing Custer was hugely successful. Custer as a heroic officer fighting valiantly against savage forces was an image popularized in Wild West extravaganzas hosted by showman "Buffalo Bill" Cody, Pawnee Bill, and others. It was not until over half a century later that historians took another look at the battle and Custer's decisions that led to his death and loss of half his command and found much to criticize.

 Gatling gun controversy 
General Alfred Terry's Dakota column included a single battery of artillery, comprising two 3-inch Ordnance rifles and two Gatling guns.Lawson, 2007, p. 48: "[Three] rapid-fire artillery pieces known as Gatling guns" were part of Terry's firepower included in the Dakota column. (According to historian Evan S. Connell, the precise number of Gatlings has not been established: either two or three.)

Custer's decision to reject Terry's offer of the rapid-fire Gatlings has raised questions among historians as to why he refused them and what advantage their availability might have conferred on his forces at the Battle of the Little Bighorn.
Lawson, 2008, p. 50: "Military historians have speculated whether this decision was a mistake. If Gatling guns had made it to the battlefield, they might have allowed Custer enough firepower to allow Custer's companies to survive on Last Stand Hill."

One factor concerned Major Marcus Reno's recent 8-day reconnaissance-in-force of the Powder-Tongue-Rosebud Rivers, June 10 to 18.Donovan, 2008, pp. 162–63: Reno's wing "left...on June 10...accompanied by a Gatling gun and its crew..." This deployment had demonstrated that artillery pieces mounted on gun carriages and hauled by horses no longer fit for cavalry mounts (so-called condemned horses) were cumbersome over mixed terrain and vulnerable to breakdowns.Sklenar, 2000, p. 72: On Reno's [June 10 to June 18] reconnaissance "the Gatling guns proved to be an annoying burden...they either fell apart or had to be disassembled and carried in pieces over rough terrain." And p. 79: "During the Reno scout [reconnoitering], the two guns were actually abandoned (and retrieved later) because soldiers got tired of dragging them over rough spots...[I]f Custer did not already have a fully formed negative opinion of the Gatlings on such an expedition, the experience of the Reno [reconnaissance of early June] surely convinced him."Donovan, 2008, p. 175: "...Reno had taken one [Gatling gun] along [on his June reconnaissance], and it had been nothing but trouble." And p. 195: Custer, in comments to his officer staff before the Battle of the Little Bighorn, said that "...if hostiles could whip the Seventh [Cavalry]...they could defeat a much larger force." Custer, valuing the mobility of the 7th Cavalry and recognizing Terry's acknowledgment of the regiment as "the primary strike force" preferred to remain unencumbered by the Gatling guns.Lawson, 2007, p. 50: "[Custer] turned down General Terry's offer to bring the three Gatling guns, because they would slow down his movement."Sklenar, 2000, p. 79: After the 7th Cavalry's departure up Rosebud Creek, "even Brisbin would acknowledge that everyone in Gibbon's command understood [that]...the Seventh was the primary strike force." Custer insisted that the artillery was superfluous to his success, in that the 7th Cavalry alone was sufficient to cope with any force they should encounter, informing Terry: "The 7th can handle anything it meets".Sklenar, 2000, p. 92: Custer "on the evening of 22 June...[informed his officer staff]...why he had not accepted the offers...of Gatling guns (he thought they might hamper his movements at a critical moment)."Donovan, 2008, p. "Explaining his refusal of the Gatling gun detachment and the Second Cavalry battalion, he convolutedly reaffirmed his confidence in the Seventh's ability to defeat any number of Indians they could find." In addition to these practical concerns, a strained relationship with Major James Brisbin induced Custer's polite refusal to integrate Brisbin's Second Cavalry unit—and the Gatling guns—into his strike force, as it would disrupt any hierarchical arrangements that Custer presided over.Sklenar, 2000, pp. 78–79: "Apparently, Terry offered [Major James] Brisbin's battalion and Gatling gun battery to accompany the Seventh, but Custer refused these additions for several reasons. First of all, Custer and Brisbin did not get along and Custer thus would not have wanted to place Brisbin in a senior command position. Custer was on the verge of abolishing the wings led by Reno and Benteen, and the inclusion of Brisbin would have complicated the arrangement he had in mind. Also, Custer retained the conviction that the Seventh could handle any force of Indians it might encounter, and he may have reasoned that taking the Second Cavalry would leave [Colonel John] Gibbon's column susceptible to attack and defeat..."

Historians have acknowledged the firepower inherent in the Gatling gun: they were capable of firing 350 .45-70 caliber rounds per minute. Jamming caused by black powder residue could lower that rate,Donovan, 2008, p. 175: "Each of these heavy, hand-cranked weapons could fire up to 350 rounds a minute, an impressive rate, but they were known to jam frequently. raising questions as to their reliability under combat conditions.Philbrick, 2010, p. 73: "Military traditionalists like to claim the gun was unreliable, but in actuality the Gatling functioned surprisingly well." Researchers have further questioned the effectiveness of the guns under the tactics that Custer was likely to face with the Lakota and Cheyenne warriors. The Gatlings, mounted high on carriages, required the battery crew to stand upright during its operation, making them easy targets for Lakota and Cheyenne sharpshooters.

Historian Robert M. Utley, in a section entitled "Would Gatling Guns Have Saved Custer?" presents two judgments from Custer's contemporaries: General Henry J. Hunt, expert in the tactical use of artillery in Civil War, stated that Gatlings "would probably have saved the command", whereas General Nelson A. Miles, participant in the Great Sioux War declared "[Gatlings] were useless for Indian fighting."

 Weapons 
 Lakota and Cheyenne 

The Lakota and Cheyenne warriors that opposed Custer's forces possessed a wide array of weaponry, from war clubs and lances to the most advanced firearms of the day. The typical firearms carried by the Lakota and Cheyenne combatants were muzzleloaders, more often a cap-lock smoothbore, the so-called Indian trade musket or Leman gunsGallear, 2001: "Trade guns were made up until the 1880s by such gunsmiths as Henry Leman, J.P. Lower and J. Henry & Son." distributed to Indians by the US government at treaty conventions. Less common were surplus rifled muskets of American Civil War vintage such as the Pattern 1853 Enfield and Springfield Model 1861. Metal cartridge weapons were prized by native combatants, such as the Henry and the Spencer lever-action rifles, as well as Sharps breechloaders. The Lakota and Cheyenne warriors also utilized bows and arrows. Effective up to 30 yards (27 meters), the arrows could readily maim or disable an opponent.

Sitting Bull's forces had no assured means to supply themselves with firearms and ammunition. Nonetheless, they could usually procure these through post-traders, licensed or unlicensed, and from gunrunners who operated in the Dakota Territory: "a horse or a mule for a repeater ... buffalo hides for ammunition." Custer's highly regarded guide, "Lonesome" Charley Reynolds, informed his superior in early 1876 that Sitting Bull's forces were amassing weapons, including numerous Winchester repeating rifles and abundant ammunition.

Of the guns owned by Lakota and Cheyenne fighters at the Little Bighorn, approximately 200 were repeating rifles, corresponding to about 1 of 10 of the encampment's two thousand able-bodied fighters who participated in the battle.

 7th Cavalry 

The troops under Custer's command carried two regulation firearms authorized and issued by the U.S. Army in early 1876: the breech-loading, single-shot Springfield Model 1873 carbine, and the 1873 Colt single-action revolver. The regulation Model 1860 saber or "long knives" were not carried by troopers upon Custer's order.Gallear, 2001: "No bayonet or hand to hand weapon was issued apart from the saber, which under Custer's orders was left behind."

Except for a number of officers and scouts who opted for personally owned and more expensive rifles and handguns, the 7th Cavalry was uniformly armed.Donovan, 2008, p. 191: "each enlisted man carried the regulation single-action breech-loading, M1873 Springfield carbine ... the standard issue sidearm was the reliable [single-action] M1873 Colt .45 cal. pistol."

Ammunition allotments provided 100 carbine rounds per trooper, carried on a cartridge belt and in saddlebags on their mounts. An additional 50 carbine rounds per man were reserved on the pack train that accompanied the regiment to the battlefield. Each trooper had 24 rounds for his Colt handgun.

The opposing forces, though not equally matched in the number and type of arms, were comparably outfitted, and neither side held an overwhelming advantage in weaponry.

 Lever-action repeaters vs. single-shot breechloaders 
Two hundred or more Lakota and Cheyenne combatants are known to have been armed with Henry, Winchester, or similar lever-action repeating rifles at the battle.Gallear, 2001: "the .44 rim-fire round fired from the Henry rifle is the most numerous Indian gun fired with almost as many individual guns identified as the Cavalry Springfield Model 1873 carbine." Virtually every trooper in the 7th Cavalry fought with the single-shot, breech-loading Springfield carbine and the Colt revolver.

Historians have asked whether the repeating rifles conferred a distinct advantage on Sitting Bull's villagers that contributed to their victory over Custer's carbine-armed soldiers.

Historian Michael L. Lawson offers a scenario based on archaeological collections at the "Henryville" site, which yielded plentiful Henry rifle cartridge casings from approximately 20 individual guns. Lawson speculates that though less powerful than the Springfield carbines, the Henry repeaters provided a barrage of fire at a critical point, driving Lieutenant James Calhoun's L Company from Calhoun Hill and Finley Ridge, forcing it to flee in disarray back to Captain Myles Keogh's I Company and leading to the disintegration of that wing of Custer's Battalion.

 Model 1873 / 1884 Springfield carbine and the U.S. Army 
After exhaustive testing—including comparisons to domestic and foreign single-shot and repeating rifles—the Army Ordnance Board (whose members included officers Marcus Reno and Alfred Terry) authorized the Springfield as the official firearm for the United States Army.Gallear, 2001: "In 1872 the Army tested a number of foreign and domestic single-shot breechloaders".

The Springfield, manufactured in a .45-70 long rifle version for the infantry and a .45-55 light carbine version for the cavalry, was judged a solid firearm that met the long-term and geostrategic requirements of the United States fighting forces.

Historian Mark Gallear claims that U.S. government experts rejected the lever-action repeater designs, deeming them ineffective in a clash with fully equipped European armies, or in case of an outbreak of another civil conflict. Gallear's analysis dismisses the allegation that rapid depletion of ammunition in lever-action models influenced the decision in favor of the single-shot Springfield. The Indian Wars are portrayed by Gallear as a minor theatre of conflict whose contingencies were unlikely to govern the selection of standard weaponry for an emerging industrialized nation.

The Springfield carbine is praised for its "superior range and stopping power" by historian James Donovan, and author Charles M. Robinson reports that the rifle could be "loaded and fired much more rapidly than its muzzle-loading predecessors, and had twice the range of repeating rifles such as the Winchester, Henry and Spencer."Robinson, 1995, p. xxviii

Gallear points out that lever-action rifles, after a burst of rapid discharge, still required a reloading interlude that lowered their overall rate of fire; Springfield breechloaders "in the long run, had a higher rate of fire, which was sustainable throughout a battle."

The breechloader design patent for the Springfield's Erskine S. Allin trapdoor system was owned by the US government and the firearm could be easily adapted for production with existing machinery at the Springfield Armory in Massachusetts. At time when funding for the post-war Army had been slashed, the prospect for economical production influenced the Ordnance Board member selection of the Springfield option.

 Malfunction of the Springfield carbine extractor mechanism 
Whether the reported malfunction of the Model 1873 Springfield carbine issued to the 7th Cavalry contributed to their defeat has been debated for years.

That the weapon experienced jamming of the extractor is not contested, but its contribution to Custer's defeat is considered negligible. This conclusion is supported by evidence from archaeological studies performed at the battlefield, where the recovery of Springfield cartridge casing, bearing tell-tale scratch marks indicating manual extraction, were rare.
The flaw in the ejector mechanism was known to the Army Ordnance Board at the time of the selection of the Model 1873 rifle and carbine, and was not considered a significant shortcoming in the overall worthiness of the shoulder arm. With the ejector failure in US Army tests as low as 1:300, the Springfield carbine was vastly more reliable than the muzzle-loading Springfields used in the Civil War.Hatch, 1997, p. 124: "Scholars have for years debated the issue of whether or not the Model 1873 Springfield carbine carried by cavalrymen, malfunctioned during the battle and [whether this] was one reason for the defeat" and "No definitive conclusion can be drawn [as to] the possible malfunction ... as being a significant cause of Custer's defeat. Writers of both pro- and anti-Custer material over the years ... have incorporated the theory into their works".

Gallear addresses the post-battle testimony concerning the copper .45-55 cartridges supplied to the troops in which an officer is said to have cleared the chambers of spent cartridges for a number of Springfield carbines. This testimony of widespread fusing of the casings offered to the Chief of Ordnance at the Reno Court of Inquiry in 1879 conflicts with the archaeological evidence collected at the battlefield. Field data showed that possible extractor failures occurred at a rate of approximately 1:30 firings at the Custer Battlefield and at a rate of 1:37 at the Reno-Benteen Battlefield.Hatch, 1997, p. 124: "How often did this defect [ejector failure] occur and cause the [Springfield carbines] to malfunction on June 25, 1876? According to Dr. Richard Fox in Archeology, History and Custer's Last Battle (1993), there were very few .45-55 caliber cartridge casings found during the digs on the battlefield that showed any evidence to pry or scratch marks [indicating manual extraction]. Only 3 of 88 [3.4%] found on the Custer [battalion] portion of the battlefield could possibly have been removed in an extraction jam. On the Reno-Benteen defense site [Reno Hill], 7 of 257 fit this category [2.7%]. If this was a representative number it would appear that malfunction from that source was minimal."

Historian Thom Hatch observes that the Model 1873 Springfield, despite the known ejector flaw, remained the standard issue shoulder arm for US troops until the early 1890s.

 Survivor claims 

Soldiers under Custer's direct command were annihilated on the first day of the battle, except for three Crow scouts and several troopers (including John Martin (Giovanni Martino)) who had left that column before the battle; one Crow scout, Curly, was the only survivor to leave after the battle had begun. Rumors of other survivors persisted for years.

Over 120 men and women would come forward over the course of the next 70 years claiming they were "the lone survivor" of Custer's Last Stand. The phenomenon became so widespread that one historian remarked, "Had Custer had all of those who claimed to be 'the lone survivor' of his two battalions he would have had at least a brigade behind him when he crossed the Wolf Mountains and rode to the attack."

The historian Earl Alonzo Brininstool suggested he had collected at least 70 "lone survivor" stories. Michael Nunnally, an amateur Custer historian, wrote a booklet describing 30 such accounts. W. A. Graham claimed that even Libby Custer received dozens of letters from men, in shocking detail, about their sole survivor experience. At least 125 alleged "single survivor" tales have been confirmed in the historical record as of July 2012.

Frank Finkel, from Dayton, Washington, had such a convincing story that historian Charles Kuhlman believed the alleged survivor, going so far as to write a lengthy defense of Finkel's participation in the battle. Douglas Ellison—mayor of Medora, North Dakota, and an amateur historian—also wrote a book in support of the veracity of Finkel's claim, but most scholars reject it.

Some of these survivors held a form of celebrity status in the United States, among them Raymond Hatfield "Arizona Bill" Gardner and Frank Tarbeaux. A few even published autobiographies that detailed their deeds at the Little Bighorn.

A modern historian, Albert Winkler, has asserted that there is some evidence to support the case of Private Gustave Korn being a genuine survivor of the battle: "While nearly all of the accounts of men who claimed to be survivors from Custer's column at the Battle of the Little Bighorn are fictitious, Gustave Korn's story is supported by contemporary records." Several contemporary accounts note that Korn's horse bolted in the early stages of the battle, whilst he was serving with Custer's 'I' company, and that he ended up joining Reno's companies making their stand on Reno Hill.

Almost as soon as men came forward implying or directly pronouncing their unique role in the battle, there were others who were equally opposed to any such claims. Theodore Goldin, a battle participant who later became a controversial historian on the event, wrote (in regards to Charles Hayward's claim to have been with Custer and taken prisoner):

The only documented and verified survivor of Custer's command (having been actually involved in Custer's part of the battle) was Captain Keogh's horse, Comanche. The wounded horse was discovered on the battlefield by General Terry's troops. Although other cavalry mounts survived, they had been taken by the Indians. Comanche eventually was returned to the fort and became the regimental mascot. Several other badly wounded horses were found and killed at the scene. Writer Evan S. Connell noted in Son of the Morning Star:

 Battlefield preservation 

The site of the battle was first preserved as a United States national cemetery in 1879 to protect the graves of the 7th Cavalry troopers. In 1946, it was re-designated as the Custer Battlefield National Monument, reflecting its association with Custer. In 1967, Major Marcus Reno was re-interred in the cemetery with honors, including an eleven-gun salute. Beginning in the early 1970s, there was concern within the National Park Service over the name Custer Battlefield National Monument failing to adequately reflect the larger history of the battle between two cultures. Hearings on the name change were held in Billings on June 10, 1991, and during the following months Congress renamed the site the Little Bighorn Battlefield National Monument.

United States memorialization of the battlefield began in 1879 with a temporary monument to the U.S. dead. In 1881, the current marble obelisk was erected in their honor. In 1890, marble blocks were added to mark the places where the U.S. cavalry soldiers fell.

Nearly 100 years later, ideas about the meaning of the battle have become more inclusive. The United States government acknowledged that Native American sacrifices also deserved recognition at the site. The 1991 bill changing the name of the national monument also authorized an Indian Memorial to be built near Last Stand Hill in honor of Lakota and Cheyenne warriors. The commissioned work by native artist Colleen Cutschall is shown in the photograph at right. On Memorial Day 1999, in consultation with tribal representatives, the U.S. added two red granite markers to the battlefield to note where Native American warriors fell. As of December 2006, a total of ten warrior markers have been added (three at the Reno–Benteen Defense Site and seven on the Little Bighorn Battlefield).

The Indian Memorial, themed "Peace Through Unity" l is an open circular structure that stands  from the 7th Cavalry obelisk. Its walls have the names of some Indians who died at the site, as well as native accounts of the battle. The open circle of the structure is symbolic, as for many tribes, the circle is sacred. The "spirit gate" window facing the Cavalry monument is symbolic as well, welcoming the dead cavalrymen into the memorial.

 In popular culture 

 John Mulvany's 1881 painting Custer's Last Rally was the first of the large images of this battle.
 In 1896, Anheuser-Busch commissioned from Otto Becker a lithographed, modified version of Cassilly Adams' painting Custer's Last Fight, which was distributed as a print to saloons all over America.
 Edgar Samuel Paxson completed his painting Custer's Last Stand in 1899. In 1963 Harold McCracken, the noted historian and Western art authority, deemed Paxson's painting "the best pictoral representation of the battle" and "from a purely artistic standpoint...one of the best if not the finest pictures which have been created to immortalize that dramatic event."
 In 1926, General Custer at the Little Big Horn opened in movie theaters in the U.S., featuring Roy Stewart with John Beck as Custer.
 The episode The 7th Is Made Up of Phantoms from the fifth season of the American television anthology series The Twilight Zone depicts modern American soldiers finding themselves near the battlefield and ultimately involved in the real battle.
 The 1964 novel, Little Big Man by American author Thomas Berger and 1970 film of the same name includes an account of the battle and portrays a manic and somewhat psychotic Custer (Richard Mulligan) realizing to his horror that he and his command are "being wiped out."
 The 1994 video game Live A Live features this story in its Western chapter. The chapter villain O. Dio was actually the horse that was the sole survivor of the battle; possession by vengeful spirits of the slain Union soldiers turned the horse into an evil man, as told by the town sheriff after defeating O. Dio.
 A fictionalized version of the battle is depicted in the 2006 video game Age of Empires III: The Warchiefs.
 In 2007, the BBC presented a one-hour drama-documentary titled Custer's Last Stand.
 The May 2011 episode of the BBC Radio 4 program In Our Time featured Melvyn Bragg (and guests) discussing the context, conditions, and consequences of the battle.
 In 2017, historian Daniele Bolelli covered the battle and the events leading to it in a three-part series on the "History on Fire" podcast.

 See also 
 Battle of the Little Bighorn reenactment
 List of battles won by Indigenous peoples of the Americas
 Fetterman Fight
 Battle of the Rosebud
 St. Clair's Defeat
 Dade battle
 Battle of Powder River

 Notes 

 References 

 Further reading 

 
 
 
 
 
 
 
 
 
 
 
 
 
 
 
 
 
 
 
 
 
 
 
 
 
 
 
 
 
 
 
 
 
 
 
 
 
 
 
 
 
 
 
 
 
 
 
 
 
 
 
 

 External links 

 Account of Custer's fight on Little Bighorn, MSS SC 860 at L. Tom Perry Special Collections, Harold B. Lee Library, Brigham Young University
 Custer Battlefield Museum, Garryowen, Montana
 Map of Battle of Little Bighorn, Part III.
 Map of Battle of Little Bighorn, Part IV. Indians.
 Map of Battle of Little Bighorn, Part V.
 Map of Battle of Little Bighorn, Part VI.
 Map of Battle of Little Bighorn, Part VII. Custer's Last Stand.
 Map of Indian battles and skirmishes after the Battle of Little Bighorn. 1876–1881.
 Battle field related
 Little Bighorn Battlefield National Monument
 Friends of the Little Bighorn Battlefield
 Portals
 The Little Big Horn Associates – includes a bibliography and articles, as well as many general and commercial links
 custerwest.org – site for traditional scholarship with sources and videos
 First-person accounts
 The Battle of Little Bighorn: An Eyewitness Account by the Lakota Chief Red Horse
 An eyewitness account by Tantanka Iyotake (Lakota Chief Sitting Bull), New York Times archive pdf.
 Complete transcript of the Reno Court of Inquiry
 100 Voices: Sioux, Cheyenne, Arapaho, Crow, Arikara and American eyewitness accounts of the Battle of the Little Bighorn
 Lists of participants
 Friends Of The Little Bighorn Battlefield – Battle information, including names of 7th Cavalry soldiers and warriors who fought in the battle.
 Muster Rolls of 7th U.S. Cavalry, June 25, 1876
 Custer Battlefield Historical and Museum Association
 Kenneth M. Hammer Collection on Custer and the Battle of the Little Bighorn (Harold G. Andersen Library, University of Wisconsin-Whitewater)
 Charles Kuhlman collection on the Battle of the Little Big Horn, MSS 1401 in the L. Tom Perry Special Collections, Harold B. Lee Library, Brigham Young University
 "Custer's Last Stand"  – An American Experience Documentary
 Verdict at the Little Bighorn – The American Surveyor'' (October 2009)

Cyclorama of Custers LAst Stand

 
1876 in the United States
George Armstrong Custer
Little Bighorn
Little Bighorn
Little Bighorn
Little Bighorn
Little Bighorn
Sitting Bull
History of Montana
Indigenous peoples of North America
History of South Dakota
American frontier
1876 in Montana Territory
Little Bighorn
June 1876 events
Little Bighorn